Lowmead is a rural town and locality in the Gladstone Region, Queensland, Australia.

Geography 
The town is situated in the north of the locality on the North Coast railway line which passes through the north-east of the locality (entering from Berajondo to the south and exiting to Colosseum to the north). The Bruce Highway passes through the south-west of the locality (entering from Kolonga to the south and exiting to Gindoran to the north).

History
In 1887,  of land were resumed from the Toweran pastoral run. The land was offered for selection for the establishment of small farms on 17 April 1887.

Lowmead Provisional School opened on 20 May 1908. It was upgraded to a State School in 1911. Due to low enrolments, the school closed on 12 December 1975 but reopened 23 January 1978.

In January and March 2013, the school was flooded, causing students to miss a number of weeks of school at the start of the school year.

Education 
Lowmead State School is a government primary (Prep-6) school for boys and girls at 3077-3083 Lowmead Road. In 2017, the school had an enrolment of 14 students with 2 teachers (1 full-time equivalent) and 4 non-teaching staff (2 full-time equivalent).

Notable residents
 Trevor Coomber, politician
 Daniel Keighran, soldier

References

External links 
 

Towns in Queensland
Gladstone Region
Localities in Queensland